Jan Richter (29 March 1923 – 25 July 1999) was a Czech ice hockey player who competed in the 1952 Winter Olympics.

References

1923 births
1999 deaths
Czech ice hockey goaltenders
Ice hockey players at the 1952 Winter Olympics
Olympic ice hockey players of Czechoslovakia
People from Tišnov
Sportspeople from the South Moravian Region
Czechoslovak ice hockey goaltenders